Sir Andrew Charles Parmley,  (born 17 October 1956) is Principal of the Harrodian School in Barnes, London, and served as Lord Mayor of London for 2016–17.

Early life
Born in Lancashire, the third of three sons, Parmley was educated at Blackpool Grammar School. He displayed an early interest in music and started playing the organ, passing the ARCO at 16 and the FRCO aged 18, before winning a scholarship to the Royal Academy of Music. He then studied for a Master's at Manchester University, before pursuing further studies at Royal Holloway College, London, and Jesus College, Cambridge.

Career
Parmley has been Director of Music at Forest School near Snaresbrook, and South Hampstead High School, and then at the Grey Coat Hospital in Westminster. 

Sir Andrew is now Principal of the Harrodian School.

He has also been Director of the Royal College of Organists since 2018.

Personal life
In 1980, Parmley married Wendy Williams, a Past Master Information Technologist.

Honours
  2018: Knight Bachelor "for services to Music, Education and Civic Engagement";
  2016: Knight of the Most Venerable Order of St John.

Livery companies and the City 
First elected as Common Councilman for the Ward of Vintry in 1992, Parmley was returned as Alderman of the City of London in 2001.

His "mother company" is the Musicians, of which he is a Past Master. Sir Andrew is also a Past Master Parish Clerk and Glass-Seller.

References

Living people
1956 births
Musicians from Blackpool
21st-century lord mayors of London
Councilmen and Aldermen of the City of London
Schoolteachers from London
Knights Bachelor